Finding Your Roots with Henry Louis Gates, Jr. is a documentary television series hosted by Henry Louis Gates Jr. that premiered on March 25, 2012, on PBS. Eight seasons have been broadcast. Its ninth season began airing on January 3, 2023.

Series overview

Episodes

Season 1 (2012)

Season 2 (2014)

Season 3 (2016)

Season 4 (2017)
Garrison Keillor was scheduled to appear in the season finale, "Funny Business". His segment was edited out of the episode after reports of inappropriate workplace behavior by him were made public.

Season 5 (2019)
The series was renewed for a fifth season which premiered on January 8, 2019.

Season 6 (2019–2021)
On July 29, 2019, it was announced that the sixth season would premiere on October 8, 2019. The season, which spanned from October 2019 to January 2021, explored the ancestry stories of Jon Batiste, Sterling K. Brown, RuPaul, Jeff Goldblum, Terry Gross, Anjelica Huston, Gayle King, Justina Machado, Marc Maron, Melissa McCarthy, Queen Latifah, Jordan Peele, Nancy Pelosi, Zac Posen, Issa Rae, Isabella Rossellini, Amy Ryan, Eric Stonestreet, Diane von Fürstenberg, Sigourney Weaver, Jeffrey Wright and Sasheer Zamata.

Season 7 (2021)

Season 8 (2022)

Season 9 (2023)

References

Lists of American non-fiction television series episodes